Palazzo Lombardia ("Lombardy Palace") is a complex of buildings in Milan, Italy, including a 43-storey,  tall skyscraper. 
It is the main seat of the Lombardy regional government, located in the Centro Direzionale di Milano (CBD, Central Business District), north-west of the city centre.

It was first inaugurated on 22 January 2010, and officially completed on 21 March 2010. After its completion, the Regione Lombardia skyscraper was briefly the tallest skyscraper both in Milan and in Italy, being taller than both the Telecom Italia Tower in Naples and the Pirelli Tower in Milan.  It lost its supremacy to the Unicredit Tower (also located in Milan) in 2011.

Palazzo Lombardia was designed by the architectural firm Pei Cobb Freed & Partners, winner of an international design competition in 2004, with Henry N. Cobb as design partner. The building won the 2012 International Architecture Award for the best new global design.

Gallery

See also
 List of tallest buildings in Italy
 List of tallest buildings in the European Union

References

External links 
  
 Winner: "2012 Best Tall Building Europe"
 SkyscraperCenter.com

 Palazzo Lombardia - Pei Cobb Freed & Partners

Government buildings completed in 2010
Skyscrapers in Milan
Skyscraper office buildings in Italy